Philippe Lavil (born 26 September 1947 in Fort-de-France, Martinique), pseudonym of Philippe Durand de La Villejégu du Fresnay, is a French singer. He remained particularly famous for his hits singles "Il tape sur des bambous", "Elle préfère l'amour en mer" (number 8 in France) and "Kolé séré", a duet with Jocelyne Béroard (number 4 in France). He was also member of Les Enfoirés in 1996, 1997 and 1998.

Discography

Albums
 1989: Nonchalances
 1992: Y a plus d'hiver
 1994: Déménage
 1996: Un zest of
 1997: Ailleurs, c'est toujours l'idéal
 2002: Retour à la case créole – #56 in France
 2007: Calypso – #75 in France

Singles
 1970: "Avec les filles je ne sais pas"
 1971: "Nanas et Nanas"
 1971: "Un poquito d'amor"
 1971: "Plus j'en ai, plus j'en veux"
 1976: "Heure locale"
 1982: "Il tape sur des bambous"
 1984: "Jamaicaine"
 1985: "Elle préfère l'amour en mer" – #8 in France
 1988: "Kolé séré" – #4 in France
 1989: "La Chica de Cuba"
 1991: "De Bretagne ou d'ailleurs" – #29 in France
 1994: "Jules apprend"

Filmography
 2006: Laura (TV series)
 2007: Bee Movie 2017: Nina'' (1 Episode)

References

External links
 

1947 births
Living people
People from Fort-de-France
French pop singers
French male singers